Tafani is a surname. Notable people with the surname include:

Federico Tafani (born 1981), Italian footballer
Jérôme Tafani (born 1958), French businessman

See also
Tafari